Akola Cricket Club Ground is a cricket ground in Akola, Vidarbha, India.  The ground has held two first-class matches, the first of which came in the 1983/84 Ranji Trophy when Vidarbha played the Railways, while the second saw Rajasthan as the visitors in the 1984/85 Ranji Trophy.

The ground is open 24/7 and is well maintained. It is a choice location of many people for daily cricket practice.

References

External links
Akola Cricket Club Ground at ESPNcricinfo
Akola Cricket Club Ground at CricketArchive

Sports venues in Maharashtra
Cricket grounds in Maharashtra
Akola
Defunct cricket grounds in India
Sports venues completed in 1983
1983 establishments in Maharashtra
20th-century architecture in India